Sir Peter Wentworth (1529–1596) was a prominent Puritan leader in the Parliament of England. He was the elder brother of Paul Wentworth and entered as member for Barnstaple in 1571. He later sat for the Cornish borough of Tregony in 1578 and for the town of Northampton in the parliaments of 1586–7, 1589, and 1593. Wentworth was the chief critic of Queen Elizabeth I, and Wentworth's 1576 Parliament address has been regarded as the sign of a new era in English Parliament politicking.  Recorded speeches and parliament sessions, jotted in the diaries of MPs like those of Thomas Cromwell, began to proliferate around this time, when public interest embraced political affairs and when issues such as freedom of speech took root in parliamentary politics.  For these reasons, Wentworth is often regarded as the first celebrated English parliamentarian.

Early life
He was the son of Sir Nicholas Wentworth of Lillingstone Lovell, chief porter of Calais, and was trained for the law in Lincoln's Inn.

He inherited the estate at Lillingstone Lovell on the death of his father in 1557.

Career
He entered Parliament as the MP for Barnstaple in 1571 and Tregony in 1572.

Wentworth firmly supported the liberties of Parliament against encroachments of the royal prerogative, about which he delivered a memorable speech on 8 February 1576. The speech was interrupted before its conclusion due to Wentworth's provocative claims, and officials imprisoned him in the Tower of London. Below are the words that concluded the spoken part of Wentworth's speech.  
Amongst other, Mr. Speaker, two things do great hurt in this place, of the which I do mean to speak: the one is a rumour which runneth about the house and this it is, "Take heed what you do, the queen's majesty liketh not such a matter. Whosoever prefereth it, she will be offended with him". Or the contrary, "Her majesty liketh of such a matter. Whosoever speaketh against it, she will be much offended with him". The other: sometimes a message is brought into the house, either of commanding or inhibiting, very injurious to the freedom of speech and consultation. I would to God, Mr. Speaker, that these two were buried in hell, I mean rumours and messages, for wicked they undoubtedly are. The reason is, the devil was the first author of them, from whom proceedeth nothing but wickedness...

It was here that Wentworth was interrupted, and the house decided "that he should be presently committed to the serjeant's ward as prisoner, and so remaining should be examined upon his said speech for the extenuating of his fault therein".  The unspoken remainder of Wentworth's speech was preserved from the draft, and its rhetoric and content continue on much in the same manner until its ending.  Eventually, Wentworth was released from the Tower after his incarceration there, and he was readmitted to Parliament. In 1586, 1589 and 1593 he was elected to represent Northampton.

In February 1587, Sir Anthony Cope (1548–1614) presented to the Speaker a bill abrogating the existing ecclesiastical law, together with a Puritan revision of the Book of Common Prayer, and Wentworth supported him by bringing forward certain articles touching the liberties of the House of Commons; Cope and Wentworth were both committed to the Tower for interference with Elizabeth I's ecclesiastical prerogative.

In 1593, Wentworth again suffered imprisonment for presenting a petition on the subject of the royal succession; and he did not regain his freedom, dying in the Tower on 10 November 1596. While in the Tower he wrote A Pithie Exhortation to her Majesty for establishing her Successor to the Crown, a notable treatise preserved in the British Library.

Family
Peter Wentworth was then twice married; his first wife, Lettice Lane, with whom he had no children, was the daughter of Sir Ralph Lane and Maud (born Parr), who was a confidante and cousin of Catherine Parr, and his second was Elizabeth Walsingham, a sister of Sir Francis Walsingham, Elizabeth's secretary of state.
He and Elizabeth had children, including a daughter, Frances Wentworth.

His third son, Thomas Wentworth (Recorder of Oxford) (c. 1568–1628), was an ardent and sometime violent opponent of royal prerogative in Parliament, of which he became a member in 1604: He represented the city of Oxford from that year until his death and became recorder of Oxford in 1607. Another son, Walter Wentworth, was also a Member of Parliament, representing Tavistock in 1601.

References

Graves, Michael A. R. Elizabethan Parliaments: 1559–1601. London and New York: Longman, 1987. .
Neale, J. E. "Peter Wentworth." The English Historical Review, Vol. 39, No. 153. (Jan., 1924), pp. 36–54.

Notes

1530 births
1596 deaths
Members of the pre-1707 English Parliament for constituencies in Cornwall
16th-century Puritans
Peter
English MPs 1571
English MPs 1572–1583
English MPs 1586–1587
English MPs 1589
English MPs 1593
Members of the Parliament of England (pre-1707) for Barnstaple